Rock Creek is a stream in Knox County in the U.S. state of Missouri. It is a tributary of the South Fork South Fabius River.

Rock Creek was named for the character of its creek bed.

See also
List of rivers of Missouri

References

Rivers of Knox County, Missouri
Rivers of Missouri